John Hansen (August 28, 1917 – May 1, 2015) was an American politician who was a member of the Wisconsin State Assembly. He was a Democrat.

He was born in Raymond, Wisconsin. Later, he resided in Franksville, Wisconsin.

Career
Hansen was elected to the Assembly in 1958. Previously, he had been an unsuccessful candidate for the seat in 1956. Additionally, he was a member of the Raymond School Board from 1940 to 1945, the Raymond Town Board from 1945 to 1948 and the Racine County, Wisconsin Board from 1951 to 1958.

References

People from Racine County, Wisconsin
Democratic Party members of the Wisconsin State Assembly
Wisconsin city council members
County supervisors in Wisconsin
School board members in Wisconsin
1917 births
2015 deaths